The Ulakhan-Botuobuya ( or Большая Ботуобуя; "Big Botuobuya"; , Ulaxan Botuobuya) is a river in Yakutia (Sakha Republic), Russia.

The river flows across mostly uninhabited territory of Mirninsky District. There is a pontoon bridge of the A331 highway stretch between Mirny and Udachny crossing the river just before its confluence with the Vilyuy.

Course 
It flows first roughly eastwards and then northeastwards across the Vilyuy Plateau within a wide valley. Finally it bends again and heads northwards. The smaller Ochchuguy-Botuobuya runs roughly parallel to it further to the east. Finally the Ulakhan-Botuobuya joins the right bank of the Vilyuy  from its mouth, a few miles downstream of the Vilyuy Dam. The river freezes between October and late May.

See also
List of rivers of Russia

References

External links
Fishing & Tourism in Yakutia

Rivers of the Sakha Republic